Hypena hemiphaea is a moth of the  family Noctuidae. It is found on Mauritius.

References

hemiphaea
Moths of Mauritius
Endemic fauna of Mauritius